Kerstin Annika Andersson (born May 8, 1968 in Mårdaklev, Västergötland, Sweden) is a Swedish actress and comedian. She has won the Guldmask, awarded for private theatre productions, twice: as best actor in 2001 for Dagens dubbel and best supporting actress in 2000 for Inte nu älskling.

She is known for working with the Swedish comedian duo Stefan & Krister.

References 

1968 births
Swedish comedians
Living people